Morača Sports Centre (Montenegrin: Sportski centar Morača, Спортски центар Морача) is a multi-sports venue that is located in Podgorica, Montenegro.

The venue is located in the new part of Podgorica, on the right bank of Morača River, after which it got its name. Construction of the sports complex began in 1978, and various sporting facilities are scattered within it, across a five hectare area. Besides being a sports venue, Morača Sports Centre also hosts various concerts and events.

History
The new venue was inaugurated with a friendly basketball game between the Yugoslav national team and Wichita State University. 

The complex's main indoor hall hosted six preliminary-round games of EuroBasket 2005. The venue underwent a major refurbishment for the tournament in order to meet the arena standards imposed by FIBA. 

With the immense growth of the popularity of water polo in Montenegro, two brand new open-air swimming pools were added to the facility in 2009, which also hosted the 2009 FINA Water Polo World League.

In 2018, the arena's main hall underwent renovations and expansion, in order to meet the arena standards of the EuroLeague. Its seating capacity was increased to 6,000, and VIP lounges were also added. The cost of the renovation project was €4.5 million euros. Also, former indoor pool arena (which was in disrepair and unused for over a decade) was repurposed as a basketball / volleyball / handball hall, with seating capacity of 2,200. The venue will host the 2022 European Women's Handball Championship for the preliminary rounds.

Facilities

The sports complex's main indoor hall serves as the primary multi-purpose indoor arena in Podgorica. It is best known as home arena of SD Budućnost Podgorica's basketball, volleyball and handball teams.

 Main Hall (capacity 6,000 seats in the stands)
 Bemax Hall (capacity 2,200 seats in the stands)
 Olympic size (50m x 25m) open-air swimming pool (capacity 1,900 seats in the stands)
 Water polo size (33,40m x 25m) indoor pool (capacity 664 seats in the stands)
 Combat Sports Hall
 Sauna
 Table Tennis Hall
 Business facilities (restaurant, gym)
 Media room
 Outdoor futsal / handball court
 Outdoor running track

Sporting events hosted
 EuroBasket 2005
 SUPERKOMBAT World Grand Prix I 2012

References

External links

Reconstruction of the Sports Center Morača
RENOVIRANJE SC MORAČA 

 
Basketball venues in Montenegro
Handball venues in Montenegro
Sport in Podgorica
Indoor arenas in Montenegro
Buildings and structures in Podgorica
Volleyball venues in Montenegro
Sports venues completed in 1978
1978 establishments in Yugoslavia
KK Budućnost